The Maldives national futsal team is controlled by the Football Association of Maldives, the governing body for futsal in the Maldives and represents the country in international futsal competitions.

Results and fixtures

The following is a list of match results in the last 12 months, as well as any future matches that have been scheduled.
Legend

2022

Team

Current squad
The following 14 players are called for 2022 AFC Futsal Asian Cup qualification in Kyrgyzstan between 1 and 15 April 2022.

Head coach:  ާAbdulla Naseer

Tournaments

FIFA Futsal World Cup
 1989 – Did not enter
 1992 – Did not enter
 1996 – Did not enter
 2000 – Did not enter
 2004 – Did not qualify
 2008 – Did not qualify
 2012 – Did not enter
 2016 – Did not enter
 2020 – To be determined

AFC Futsal Championship
 1999 – Did not enter
 2000 – Did not enter
 2001 – Did not enter
 2002 – Did not enter
 2003 – Did not enter
 2004 – Group stage
 2005 – Group stage
 2006 – Did not qualify
 2007 – Did not qualify
 2008 – Did not qualify
 2010 – Did not enter
 2012 – Did not enter
 2014 – Did not enter
 2016 – Did not enter

Results
http://old.futsalplanet.com/matches

20/09/2017 - Ashgabat (TMS)
- AIG - Men - Ashgabat 2017
China 	vs 	Maldives 	9 - 3

19/09/2017 - Ashgabat (TMS)
- AIG - Men - Ashgabat 2017
Uzbekistan 	vs 	Maldives 	9 - 1

18/09/2017 - Ashgabat (TMS)
- AIG - Men - Ashgabat 2017
Maldives 	vs 	Afghanistan 	1 - 6

16/09/2017 - Ashgabat (TMS)
- AIG - Men - Ashgabat 2017
Maldives 	vs 	UAE 	1 - 3

28/03/2008 - Shah Alam, Selangor (MLY)
- AFC Asian Futsal Championship - Thailand 2008 (Q)
Vietnam 	vs 	Maldives 	4 - 2

27/03/2008 - Shah Alam, Selangor (MLY)
- AFC Asian Futsal Championship - Thailand 2008 (Q)
Maldives 	vs 	Malaysia 	4 - 9

26/03/2008 - Shah Alam, Selangor (MLY)
- AFC Asian Futsal Championship - Thailand 2008 (Q)
Chinese Taipei 	vs 	Maldives 	4 - 2

05/03/2007 - RootDamages FasT here (CHT)
- AFC Asian Futsal Ch. - Japan 2007 (qualifying round)
Maldives 	vs 	Philippines 	2 - 5

03/03/2007 - RootDamages FasT here (CHT)
- AFC Asian Futsal Ch. - Japan 2007 (qualifying round)
Maldives 	vs 	Lebanon 	1 - 14

01/03/2007 - RootDamages FasT here (CHT)
- AFC Asian Futsal Ch. - Japan 2007 (qualifying round)
Chinese Taipei 	vs 	Maldives 	6 - 1

22/04/2006 - Kuantan/Pahang (MLY)
- Tashkent - Uzbekistan 2006 - Qualifiers
Vietnam 	vs 	Maldives 	5 - 0

20/04/2006 - Kuantan/Pahang (MLY)
- Tashkent - Uzbekistan 2006 - Qualifiers
Malaysia 	vs 	Maldives 	8 - 0

19/04/2006 - Kuantan/Pahang (MLY)
- Tashkent - Uzbekistan 2006 - Qualifiers
Maldives 	vs 	Cambodia 	2 - 3

18/04/2006 - Kuantan/Pahang (MLY)
- Tashkent - Uzbekistan 2006 - Qualifiers
Turkmenistan 	vs 	Maldives 	8 - 0

01/06/2005 - Ho Chi Min City (VIE)
- Ho Chi Min City - Vietnam 2005
Maldives 	vs 	Korea Republic 	3 - 13

30/05/2005 - Ho Chi Min City (VIE)
- Ho Chi Min City - Vietnam 2005
Maldives 	vs 	Hong Kong 	1 - 6

29/05/2005 - Ho Chi Min City (VIE)
- Ho Chi Min City - Vietnam 2005
Chinese Taipei 	vs 	Maldives 	4 - 1

26/05/2005 - Ho Chi Min City (VIE)
- Ho Chi Min City - Vietnam 2005
Thailand 	vs 	Maldives 	25 - 0

24/05/2005 - Ho Chi Min City (VIE)
- Ho Chi Min City - Vietnam 2005
Turkmenistan 	vs 	Maldives 	5 - 0

23/05/2005 - Ho Chi Min City (VIE)
- Ho Chi Min City - Vietnam 2005
China 	vs 	Maldives 	21 - 0

21/04/2004 - Macau (MCO)
- Macau - Macau 2004
Chinese Taipei 	vs 	Maldives 	11 - 2

18/04/2004 - Macau (MCO)
- Macau - Macau 2004
Maldives 	vs 	Korea Republic 	3 - 23

16/04/2004 - Macau (MCO)
- Macau - Macau 2004
Kuwait 	vs 	Maldives 	20 - 0

References

External links

Maldives
National sports teams of the Maldives
Futsal in the Maldives